Kristiansund Fotballklubb is a Norwegian association football club from Kristiansund, Møre og Romsdal.

The men's football team currently plays in the Fourth Division, the fifth tier of the Norwegian football league system. The team last played in the 1. divisjon (second tier) in 1991 and in the 2. divisjon (third tier) in 1998. In 2000, they won their 3. divisjon group but lost the two-legged play-off and failed to win promotion.

In the autumn of 2003 it formed a partnership with rivals Clausenengen FK to field the team Kristiansund BK. Kristiansund BK is currently a Norwegian Eliteserien club. Despite the merger, Kristiansund continued with their first team, and was forced to relegate to 4. divisjon ahead of the 2004 season to make room for the new club in 3. divisjon.

Recent seasons 
{|class="wikitable"
|-bgcolor="#efefef"
! Season
! Division (Group)
! Pos.
! Pl.
! W
! D
! L
! GS
! GA
! Pts.
! Cup
!Notes
|-
|2014
|4. divisjon
|align=right bgcolor=#DDFFDD| 1
|align=right|22||align=right|19||align=right|1||align=right|2
|align=right|86||align=right|32||align=right|58
|
|Promoted to 3. divisjon
|-
|2015
|3. divisjon (8)
|align=right |2
|align=right|26||align=right|15||align=right|2||align=right|9
|align=right|64||align=right|56||align=right|47
|First qualifying round
|
|-
|2016
|3. divisjon (8)
|align=right bgcolor="#FFCCCC"| 9
|align=right|26||align=right|11||align=right|2||align=right|13
|align=right|47||align=right|51||align=right|35
|First round
|Relegated to 4. divisjon
|-
|2017
|4. divisjon
|align=right |7
|align=right|22||align=right|16||align=right|2||align=right|4
|align=right|106||align=right|23||align=right|50
|First qualifying round
|
|-
|2018
|4. divisjon 
|align=right |7
|align=right|22||align=right|9||align=right|5||align=right|8
|align=right|56||align=right|32||align=right|32
|First qualifying round
|
|-
|2019
|4. divisjon 
|align=right |5
|align=right|22||align=right|10||align=right|2||align=right|10
|align=right|61||align=right|52||align=right|32
|First qualifying round
|
|}

References

 Official site 

Football clubs in Norway
Sport in Kristiansund
1912 establishments in Norway
Association football clubs established in 1912